Paul Grant (born 23 March 1993) is a Scottish footballer, who played as a goalkeeper for Musselburgh Athletic among other clubs. Grant has previously played for Hibernian, Berwick Rangers, Livingston, Bonnyrigg Rose,  Tranent Juniors,  Broxburn Athletic and Whitehill Welfare.

Early life
Grant attended Liberton High School.

Career
Grant was a member of the Hibernian under 19 squad. He was promoted to the first team squad late in the 2011–12 season, after first choice goalkeeper Graham Stack was injured in the Scottish Cup semi-final victory against Aberdeen. With Hibs having secured their SPL status and due to play in the 2012 Scottish Cup Final the following week, Grant made his professional debut on the final day of the 2011–12 Scottish Premier League season.

Grant moved on loan to Berwick Rangers in July 2013. Berwick manager Ian Little said in September that he thought Grant had been "terrific" and that he would look to extend the loan agreement with Hibernian. Grant returned to Hibernian in January 2014, having made 17 appearances for Berwick. He was released by Hibernian at the end of the 2013–14 season.

Grant signed for Livingston in July 2014.

On 23 January 2015, Grant signed for Junior club Bonnyrigg Rose.

On 1 August 2015, He signed for Tranent Juniors.

On 21 July 2018, He signed for Broxburn Athletic, But left in December of that year.

In December 2018, He signed for Whitehill Welfare, but left at the end of the season.

In July 2019, He signed for Musselburgh Athletic.

Career statistics

References

1993 births
Living people
Scottish footballers
Association football goalkeepers
Hibernian F.C. players
Berwick Rangers F.C. players
Livingston F.C. players
Broxburn Athletic F.C. players
Scottish Premier League players
People educated at Liberton High School
Footballers from Edinburgh
Scottish Professional Football League players
Bonnyrigg Rose Athletic F.C. players